Mohamed Amine Aksas (born 5 March 1983, in Algiers) is an Algerian former football, and the current coach of SC Aïn Defla.

Club career
On 18 June 2008 Aksas joined ES Sétif. In his first season with the club, he helped ES Sétif win the league title.

On 16 June 2011 Aksas, along with his CR Belouizdad teammate Ahmed Mekehout, agreed to join Saudi Arabian club Al-Qadisiyah FC on a one-year contract.

Honours
 Won the Algerian Championnat National once with ES Sétif in 2009

References

External links
 DZFoot Profile

1983 births
Algerian footballers
Living people
Footballers from Algiers
ES Sétif players
Algeria under-23 international footballers
OMR El Annasser players
Algerian Ligue Professionnelle 1 players
CR Belouizdad players
Algeria youth international footballers
MC Alger players
CS Constantine players
Association football defenders
21st-century Algerian people